Red nuggets is the nickname given to rare, unusually small galaxies packed with large amounts of red stars that were originally observed by Hubble Space Telescope in 2005 in the young universe. They are ancient remnants of the first massive galaxies. The environments of red nuggets are usually consistent with the general elliptical galaxy population. Most red nuggets have merged with other galaxies, but some managed to stay unscathed.

Naming 
Red nuggets are not only nicknamed for their size and color, but also for how precious the discovery is to curious astronomers since it challenged current theories at the time the term was coined on galaxy formation.

Formation of red nuggets 
Red nuggets are formed from blue nuggets. Blue nuggets are early, stream fed, star-forming systems that are quenched inside-out within the inner kiloparsec (kpc) and dissipatively compacted into red nuggets at their peak of gas compaction. The compaction of the blue nugget happens at an approximately constant specific star formation rate (or SFR). The quenching of the blue nugget happens at a completely constant stellar surface density. Galaxies with more mass quench earlier than galaxies with low amounts of mass because galaxies with low amounts of mass try to quench several times. The compaction happens due to a fierce period of inflow involving (mostly small) mergers and counter-rotating streams or recycled gas. It is also frequently associated with extreme disc instability. The quenching happens because of the extremely high SFR, stellar and supernova feedback, and possibly also active galactic nuclei feedback due to the high gas density in the center of the red nugget.

Star formation 
Data from NASA's Chandra X-Ray Observatory observing the red nuggets Mrk 1216 and PGC 032673 has shown that the central black holes suppress star formation in red nuggets with their heat and feed on the gas surrounding them. This brings up the intriguing question on how they could possibly be packed so densely with stars. Results show that red nuggets may have untapped stellar "fuel" to produce their unusually large number of stars. Another theory says that red nuggets are young elliptical galaxies, therefore forming the same way they do.

Sloan Digital Sky Survey 
A team led by Ivana Damjanov found over 600 red nugget candidates in the Sloan Digital Sky Survey (or SDSS) database, of which 9 were confirmed as red nuggets. These red nuggets have been missed so long because, due to their extremely small size, they look like stars in pictures. But their spectra shows what they really are. Damjanov expressed how truly amazing the discovery was when she said, “Looking for ‘red nuggets’ in the Sloan Digital Sky Survey was like panning a riverbed, washing away silt and mud to uncover bits of gold,”Before Damjanov and her team had thought to look through the immense database of the SDSS, no one could find the elusive galaxies after their original discovery in 2005.

See also 
 List of galaxies
 List of nearest galaxies
 List of spiral galaxies

References 

Galaxies